Shahtaj Qizilbash (1905 – 2008) was a women's rights advocate in Pakistan.

Career
Shahtaj Qizilbash was a founding member of the Women's Action Forum.

Shahtaj Qizilbash belonged to the noble Qizilbash family of Lahore, Punjab, Pakistan. She got her early education from the Convent of Jesus and Mary, Lahore. She spent a lot of time with her uncle Nawab Muzaffar Ali Qizilbash, who was Pakistan's ambassador to France and later Finance Minister of Pakistan. When she returned to Pakistan from England in 1983, she found the atmosphere charged with women on the roads, particularly against the discriminatory laws introduced by President Zia ul Haq.  Shahtaj Qizilbash was active member of the Women's Action Forum (WAF). When Asma Jahangir, Gul Rukh, Hina Jilani and Shela established an all women's law firm (the AGHS), she joined them and took the task of paralegal training.

See also
 Qizilbash
 Nawab Muzaffar Ali Qizilbash
 Women's Action Forum

References

1905 births
2008 deaths
20th-century Pakistani lawyers
Pakistani democracy activists
Pakistani human rights activists
Pakistani women lawyers
Pakistani women's rights activists
Pakistani civil rights activists
Muslim reformers
Convent of Jesus and Mary, Lahore alumni
Lawyers from Lahore